The 2013 Southern California Open was a professional women's tennis tournament played on hard courts.  It was the 4th edition of the tournament since its resumption in 2010, and a Premier tournament on the 2013 WTA Tour. It took place in Carlsbad, California, United States from July 29 to August 4.

Singles main-draw entrants

Seeds

 1 Rankings are as of July 22, 2013

Other entrants
The following players received wildcards into the singles main:
  Allie Kiick
  Virginie Razzano 
  Samantha Stosur

The following players received entry from the qualifying draw:
  Marina Erakovic
  Sachie Ishizu
  Sesil Karatantcheva
  CoCo Vandeweghe

Withdrawals
Before the tournament
  Marion Bartoli (hamstring injury)
  Kirsten Flipkens
  Bojana Jovanovski
  Kristina Mladenovic
  Anastasia Pavlyuchenkova

Doubles main-draw entrants

Seeds

1 Rankings are as of July 22, 2013

Other entrants
The following pairs received wildcards into the doubles main draw:
  Daniela Hantuchová /  Martina Hingis
  Petra Kvitová /  Tamira Paszek

Finals

Singles

  Samantha Stosur defeated  Victoria Azarenka, 6–2, 6–3

Doubles

  Raquel Kops-Jones /  Abigail Spears defeated  Chan Hao-ching /  Janette Husárová, 6–4, 6–1

External links
Official website

2013
Mercury Insurance Open
Southern California Open